Son Byeong-jun (born 14 October 1995) is a South Korean para table tennis player. He won a silver medal at the 2012 Summer Paralympics.

He has a congenital intellectual impairment.

References

1995 births
Living people
Table tennis players at the 2016 Summer Paralympics
Table tennis players at the 2012 Summer Paralympics
Medalists at the 2012 Summer Paralympics
South Korean male table tennis players
Paralympic silver medalists for South Korea
Paralympic table tennis players of South Korea
Paralympic medalists in table tennis
People from Chuncheon
Sportspeople with intellectual disability
Sportspeople from Gangwon Province, South Korea